Lenoir Cotton Mill-Blue Bell Inc. Plant is an historical textile mill located in Lenoir, North Carolina. Built in 1902, it is listed on the National Register of Historic Places.

History 
The Lenoir Cotton Mill-Blue Bell Inc. Plant was established in 1902. It was known for manufacturing suspender-back denim and military uniforms for the U.S. Armed Forces during World War II.

References 

1902 establishments in North Carolina
National Register of Historic Places in Caldwell County, North Carolina